The Shubenacadie River is a river in Nova Scotia, Canada. It has a meander length of approximately 72 km from its source at Shubenacadie Grand Lake to its mouth at the historic seaport village of Maitland on Cobequid Bay, site of the building of the William D. Lawrence, the largest wooden ship ever built in Canada.   In 2009, the I Backpack Canada blog named the Shubenacadie one of the top five whitewater rivers in Canada. The lower 30 km of the river (from the point where the Stewiacke River meets to the mouth) is tidal and the river experiences a tidal bore twice daily, with some bores reaching up to 3 m in height at certain points along the river. Local tourism operators offer adventure seekers a chance to ride with the bore on high-horse power Zodiac Hurricanes. Tidal Bore Rafting was invented at the Tidal Bore Rafting Resort by H. Knoll. It is also a popular surfing spot for experienced Sea Kayakers.

The river flows through part of northern Halifax County, forming the boundary with Hants County before forming the boundary between Hants and Colchester County.

The Shubenacadie Valley hosts a diversified agricultural economy and is also experiencing suburban sprawl, given its location in the Halifax-Truro transportation corridor.

The river is also extremely popular among anglers who mainly target striped bass.

Bald eagles roost in the trees along the river's banks and can be seen from the river throughout the year.

See also
 Shubenacadie Canal
 List of rivers of Nova Scotia

References

Rivers of Nova Scotia
Landforms of Colchester County
Landforms of Halifax, Nova Scotia
Landforms of Hants County, Nova Scotia
Landforms of Halifax County, Nova Scotia